FC Sportul Studențesc, commonly referred to as Sportul is a Romanian professional football club based in Bucharest, that last played at senior level in the Liga IV. Founded in 1916, Sportul Studențesc was one of the oldest Romanian clubs still active. The club's best European performance came in the 1979–80 Balkans Cup, when it won the trophy, defeating Yugoslavian side NK Rijeka in the final. The club made it to the Balkans Cup final on one other occasion, in 1976, when it lost to another Yugoslavian side, Dinamo Zagreb. In the UEFA Cup, Sportul Studențesc's most notable performance came in the 1987–88 season, when the club reached the Third Round.

Domestically, Sportul Studențesc's best league performance was a second-place finish in the 1985–86 season, just behind (back then) European Champions, Steaua București. In the Romanian Cup, Sportul Studenţesc made it to the final on three occasions, in 1938–1939, 1942–1943, and 1978–1979 losing all three matches to Rapid București, CFR Turnu Severin, and Steaua București, respectively.

Currently, the team is active only at youth level.

Chronology of names

History

On 11 February 1916 "Sporting Club Universitar Studențesc" was born, as an initiative of a group of professors and students. At the beginning, football, athletics and tennis were the club's only three departments. The president was professor Traian Lalescu, the world famous mathematician.

"Sporting" had no stadium of its own, and the team used to play here and there. Even after acceding in the first national league, the stadium was still in its project phase. It was only when "Stiința" was established in 1954 that the club was allowed to use "Belvedere" stadium in the Regie borough of Bucharest.

The history of the club can be divided into several distinct periods. The first period lasted until World War II and culminated with the accession in the first national league. Afterwards the club disappeared in the dawn of communism and was reborn and grown again to accede to the first division. The mid to late 1970s, and the 1980s "Hagi period" saw the club's best performances. Led by then-president Barbu Emil "Mac" Popescu, the club reached the Balkans Cup final on two occasion, winning it once; it qualified to the UEFA Cup on six occasions, it reached the Romanian Cup final once, and it had the highest league finish in club history in the 1985–86 season. Stars like Marcel Coraș, Mircea Sandu, Gino Iorgulescu, and Gheorghe Hagi played for Sportul Studențesc during that time period.

After the fall of communism in late 1989, the club struggled to keep afloat. Financial struggles and a constant loss of talented players lead to an unavoidable outcome. At the end of the 1997–98 season the club relegated to the second division, after more than 25 years at the top flight. One year later, the club came very close to a demotion to the third division, however, with the help of a young investor, Vasile Șiman corroborated with massive rejuvenation of the squad, Sportul Studențesc turned things around and the team remained in the second league.

Two years later, at the end of the 2000–01 season Sportul Studențesc saw its third accession to the first league. After a fierce battle with Farul Constanța for the top spot in the standings, "the students" finished first, with 81 points and a 71–17 goal differential. The promotion to the top flight was short-lived. At the end of the 2001–02 season, the club relegated back to the second league.

At the end of the 2003–2004 season, the club, once again, promoted to the first league, despite having sold half of their squad from the previous season. They had a praiseworthy evolution in the 2004–2005 seasons, ending the championship in sixth place with Gigel Bucur the league's top scorer (21 goals). Throughout the 2005–06 season the team, coached by former international player Dan Petrescu in the first half of the season, and by Gheorghe Mulțescu in the second half, had a very good run, finishing the season in fourth place, the highest since 1987. During the off-season, the club was relegated due to financial reasons.

After spending four seasons in Liga II, at the end of the 2009–10 season, the club promoted back to Liga I. Sportul finished the 2010–11 season in last place, and therefore, should have been relegated. However, due to licensing controversies by other Liga I clubs, Sportul Studențesc was allowed to continue playing in the first league for the 2011–2012 season. At the end of the 2011–12 season, the club finished 17th and relegated from the top tier.

Colours and badge
The team's colours are black and white, the traditional students' team colours.

The logo consists of a stylized "S" on a black and white background, alongside the club's official name and year of establishment.

European record

Shirt sponsors and manufacturers

Honours

Domestic

Leagues
Liga I
Runners-up (1): 1985–86
Liga II
Winners (4): 1936–37, 1971–72, 2000–01, 2003–04
Runners-up (3): 1965–66, 1970–71, 2009–10
Liga III
Winners (1): 1958–59
Liga IV  – Bucharest
Runners-up (1): 2014–15

Cups
Cupa României
Runners-up (3): 1938–39, 1942–43, 1978–79

European
Balkans Cup:
Winners (1): 1979–80
Runners-up (1): 1976

Notable former players

Famous Managers

 Ioan Andone
 Gabi Balint
 Constantin Cernăianu
 Ion "Jackie" Ionescu
 Traian Ionescu
 Marian Mihail
 Ion Motroc
 Gheorghe Mulțescu
 Angelo Niculescu
 Gheorghe Ola
 Dan Petrescu
 Mircea Rădulescu

Romanian League goalscorer of the year

 1983–84  Marcel Coraș
 1984–85  Gheorghe Hagi
 1985–86  Gheorghe Hagi
 2004–05  Gheorghe Bucur
 2005–06  Ionuț Mazilu

References

External links
Sportul Studențesc official website
Sportul Studențesc supporter's website

 
Defunct football clubs in Romania
Football clubs in Bucharest
Association football clubs established in 1916
Association football clubs disestablished in 2017
Liga I clubs
Liga II clubs
Liga III clubs
Liga IV clubs
University and college association football clubs in Romania
1916 establishments in Romania
2017 establishments in Romania